The Log Cabin at present-day 1805 Hancock Street in Bellevue, Nebraska was built in the 1830s, and is commonly acknowledged as the oldest building in Nebraska.

History 

A trapper built the log cabin around 1835 in the Missouri River floodplains, and around 1850 it was moved to its present-day location. It was used as a residence until 1954, occupied by just three families from 1856 to 1950.

The building was one and a half stories tall with a bedroom in the loft. Hand-hewn cottonwood logs surrounded a dirt floor and fireplace. In 1906 a kitchen and pantry were added to the east side; in 1972, a basement was dug and the main floor was restored. Today, the Sarpy County Historical Society maintains the building in near-original condition as a memorial to the living conditions of the pioneers.

The property was listed on the National Register of Historic Places on October 16, 1970.

See also
List of the oldest buildings in Nebraska

References

External links

History of Sarpy County, Nebraska
Fur trade
Houses on the National Register of Historic Places in Nebraska
1835 establishments in the United States
Buildings and structures in Bellevue, Nebraska
Tourist attractions in Sarpy County, Nebraska
Houses in Sarpy County, Nebraska
National Register of Historic Places in Sarpy County, Nebraska